Charles Porset (15 April 1944 – 25 May 2011, aged 67) was a French writer and historian. He wrote numerous books, articles and papers on the "Fait Masonic" in the eighteenth century.

Biography 
Charles Porset taught philosophy in high school until 1976, before entering the École normale supérieure of Fontenay-aux-Roses in 1977 as an agrégation lecturer. At that time, he participated in the founding of the Society for the History and Epistemology of Language Sciences, in collaboration with Sylvain Auroux.

In charge of research at the CNRS within the framework of the URA 96 of the CNRS in Paris IV, "dixhuitièmiste", he renews the reading of Montesquieu, Voltaire and Rousseau His work revisits the thinking of the Lumières.

Freemason 
Charles Porset was a member of the Grand Orient de France, in which he held several important positions defending a modern, committed and demanding conception of freemasonry.

Main publications 
1995: Voltaire franc-maçon
1996: .
1996: Mirabeau Franc-Maçon publisher: Rumeur des Ages 
2000: 
2003: 
2012: 
2012: 
2013:

See also 
 Freemasonry in France

References

External links 
 Les Francs-maçons et la Révolution article by C. Porset on Persée 
 Hommage à Charles PORSET
 Resume
 Obituary

1944 births
2011 deaths
French Freemasons
French historiographers
20th-century French historians
21st-century French historians